Home Island, also known locally as Pulu Selma, is one of only two permanently inhabited islands of the 26 islands of the Southern Atoll of the Cocos (Keeling) Islands, an Australian external territory in the central-eastern Indian Ocean.

Description
Local attractions include a museum covering local culture and traditions, flora and fauna, Australian naval history, and the early owners of the Cocos-Keeling Islands.

The Home Island Mosque is one of the busiest places on the island, and the minaret is painted in territorial flag colours of green and gold.

There is also a trail leading to Oceania House, which was the ancestral home of the Clunies-Ross family, the former rulers of the Cocos-Keeling Islands and is over a century old.

Education
Cocos Islands District High School operates a primary education centre on Home Island; most of the staff live on West Island and travel to their jobs on a daily basis. Secondary level students go to the West Island campus.

Heritage listings
Home Island contains a number of heritage-listed sites, including:
 Captain Ballard's Grave
 Jalan Kipas: Early Settlers' Graves
 Home Island Cemetery
 Jalan Panti: Home Island Foreshore
 Jalan Bunga Mawar: Home Island Industrial Precinct
 Jalan Bunga Kangkong: Oceania House
 Jalan Bunga Mawar: Old Co-Op Shop

References

External links